Trigonopterus attenboroughi is a species of flightless weevil in the genus Trigonopterus from Indonesia.

Etymology
The species was named after English naturalist Sir David Attenborough.

Description
It has recurring indentations representative of a strawberry.  The body is almost oval.  Length is around 2.14–2.63 mm.  General coloration is rust-colored, with the head and pronotum being almost black.

Range

Phylogeny
The species is part of the T. attenboroughi species group.

See also
 List of things named after David Attenborough and his works

References

attenboroughi
Beetles described in 2014
Beetles of Asia
David Attenborough